Sunset Over Soho is a 1943 detective novel by the British writer Gladys Mitchell. It is the sixteenth in her long-running series featuring the psychoanalyst and amateur detective Mrs Bradley. Bradley was one of a number of investigators active during the Golden Age of Detective Fiction.

A review by Ralph Partridge in the New Statesman noted "Miss Mitchell does her best to represent English surrealism. Sunset over Soho seems to centre round a body in a coffin, which starts its career somewhere up the Thames and eventually comes to earth in an air-raid shelter in Soho, having apparently dropped out of a church. Someone takes part in the evacuation of Dunkirk, and someone else takes a trip to the Canary Islands. No incident is ever explained, and there are plenty of incidents; while Mrs. Bradley lords it over all. This must be the deepest of Miss Mitchell’s constructions, as even her most ardent fans have been unable to fathom its beauties."

Synopsis
At the height of the Second World War, a crated body is found in the basement of the London air raid shelter in which Mrs Bradley is working.

References

Bibliography
 Klein, Kathleen Gregory. Great Women Mystery Writers: Classic to Contemporary. Greenwood Press, 1994.
 Miskimmin, Esme. 100 British Crime Writers. Springer Nature, 2020.
 Reilly, John M. Twentieth Century Crime & Mystery Writers. Springer, 2015.

1943 British novels
Novels by Gladys Mitchell
British crime novels
British mystery novels
British thriller novels
Novels set in London
British detective novels
Michael Joseph books